A biscuit is a flour-based baked and shaped food product. In most countries biscuits are typically hard, flat, and unleavened. They are usually sweet and may be made with sugar, chocolate, icing, jam, ginger, or cinnamon. They can also be savoury, similar to crackers. Types of biscuit include sandwich biscuits, digestive biscuits, ginger biscuits, shortbread biscuits, chocolate chip cookies, chocolate-coated marshmallow treats, Anzac biscuits, biscotti, and speculaas.

In most of North America, nearly all hard sweet biscuits are called "cookies", while the term "biscuit" is used for a soft, leavened quick bread similar to a less sweet version of a scone.

Variations in meaning of biscuit

 In most of the English-speaking world, a "biscuit" is a small, hard baked product that would be called either a "cookie" or a "cracker" in the United States and sometimes in Canada. "Biscuits" in the United Kingdom, the Isle of Man, and Ireland are usually hard and may be savoury or sweet, such as chocolate biscuits, digestives, hobnobs, ginger nuts, rich tea, shortbread, bourbons, and custard creams. The term "cookie" typically refers to only one type of biscuit (the sweeter baked dough typically containing chocolate chips or raisins); however, it may also locally refer to specific types of biscuits or breads. 
 In the United States and some parts of Canada, a "biscuit" is a quick bread, somewhat similar to an unsweetened scone, but with a texture more 'fluffy and flaky' vs. 'sturdy and crumbly'. Biscuits may be referred to as either "baking powder biscuits" or "buttermilk biscuits" if buttermilk is used rather than milk as a liquid, as buttermilk is not only flavorful but acidic (allowing use of baking soda vs. baking powder which is a mixture of baking soda with an acidifier and buffer). A Southern regional variation using the term "beaten biscuit" (or in New England "sea biscuit") is closer to hardtack than soft dough biscuits.
 In Canada, the term "biscuit" can simultaneously refer to what is commonly identified as a biscuit in either the United Kingdom or the United States. The Canadian Oxford Dictionary describes each word in reference to the other; "biscuit" can mean "Brit. a cookie", whilst "cookie" can mean "N. Amer. a small sweet biscuit".  "Tea biscuit" is also a standard Canadianism for the "North American" biscuit.

Etymology
The modern-day difference in the English language regarding the word "biscuit" is remarked on by British cookery writer Elizabeth David in English Bread and Yeast Cookery, in the chapter "Yeast Buns and Small Tea Cakes" and section "Soft Biscuits". She writes, It is interesting that these soft biscuits (such as scones) are common to Scotland and Guernsey, and that the term biscuit as applied to a soft product was retained in these places, and in America, whereas in England it has completely died out.

 
The Old French word bescuit is derived from the Latin words bis (twice) and coquere, coctus (to cook, cooked), and, hence, means "twice-cooked". This is because biscuits were originally cooked in a twofold process: first baked, and then dried out in a slow oven. This term was then adapted into English in the 14th century during the Middle Ages, in the Middle English word bisquite, to represent a hard, twice-baked product (see the German Zwieback). The Dutch language from around 1703 had adopted the word koekje ("little cake") to have a similar meaning for a similar hard, baked product. The difference between the secondary Dutch word and that of Latin origin is that, whereas the koekje is a cake that rises during baking, the biscuit, which has no raising agent, in general does not (see gingerbread/ginger biscuit), except for the expansion of heated air during baking. Another cognate Dutch form is beschuit, which is a circular and brittle grain product usually covered by savoury or sweet toppings and eaten at breakfast.

When continental Europeans began to emigrate to colonial North America, the two words and their "same but different" meanings began to clash. The words cookie or cracker became the words of choice to mean a hard, baked product. Further confusion has been added by the adoption of the word biscuit for a small leavened bread popular in the United States. According to the American English dictionary Merriam-Webster, a cookie is a "small flat or slightly raised cake". A biscuit is "any of various hard or crisp dry baked product" similar to the American English terms cracker or cookie, or "a small quick bread made from dough that has been rolled out and cut or dropped from a spoon".

In a number of other European languages, terms derived from the Latin bis coctus refer instead to yet another baked product, similar to the sponge cake; e.g. Spanish bizcocho, German Biskuit, Russian бисквит (biskvit), Polish biszkopt.

In modern Italian usage, the term biscotto is used to refer to any type of hard twice-baked biscuit, and not only to the cantuccini as in English-speaking countries.

History

Biscuits for travel

The need for nutritious, easy-to-store, easy-to-carry, and long-lasting foods on long journeys, in particular at sea, was initially solved by taking live food along with a butcher/cook. However, this took up additional space on what were either horse-powered treks or small ships, reducing the time of travel before additional food was required. This resulted in early armies' adopting the style of hunter-foraging.

The introduction of the baking of processed cereals including the creation of flour provided a more reliable source of food. Egyptian sailors carried a flat, brittle loaf of millet bread called dhourra cake while the Romans had a biscuit called buccellum. Roman cookbook Apicius describes: "a thick paste of fine wheat flour was boiled and spread out on a plate. When it had dried and hardened, it was cut up and then fried until crisp, then served with honey and pepper."

Many early physicians believed that most medicinal problems were associated with digestion. Hence, for both sustenance and avoidance of illness, a daily consumption of a biscuit was considered good for health.

Hard biscuits soften as they age. To solve this problem, early bakers attempted to create the hardest biscuit possible. Because it is so hard and dry, if properly stored and transported, navies' hardtack will survive rough handling and high temperature. Baked hard, it can be kept without spoiling for years as long as it is kept dry. For long voyages, hardtack was baked four times, rather than the more common two. To soften hardtack for eating, it was often dunked in brine, coffee, or some other liquid or cooked into a skillet meal.

The collection Sayings of the Desert Fathers mentions that Anthony the Great (who lived in the 4th century AD) ate biscuits and the text implies that it was a popular food among monks of the time and region.

At the time of the Spanish Armada in 1588, the daily allowance on board a Royal Navy ship was one pound of biscuit plus one gallon of beer. Samuel Pepys in 1667 first regularised naval victualling with varied and nutritious rations. Royal Navy hardtack during Queen Victoria's reign was made by machine at the Royal Clarence Victualling Yard at Gosport, Hampshire, stamped with the Queen's mark and the number of the oven in which they were baked. This left the sheets sufficiently coherent to be placed in the oven in one piece and when baked they were easy to separate. The hexagonal shape rather than traditional circular biscuits meant a saving in material and was easier to pack. Biscuits remained an important part of the Royal Navy sailor's diet until the introduction of canned foods. Canned meat was first marketed in 1814; preserved beef in tins was officially added to Royal Navy rations in 1847.

Confectionery biscuits

Early biscuits were hard, dry, and unsweetened. They were most often cooked after bread, in a cooling bakers' oven; they were a cheap form of sustenance for the poor.

By the 7th century AD, cooks of the Persian empire had learnt from their forebears the techniques of lightening and enriching bread-based mixtures with eggs, butter, and cream, and sweetening them with fruit and honey. One of the earliest spiced biscuits was gingerbread, in French, pain d'épices, meaning "spice bread", brought to Europe in 992 by the Armenian monk Grégoire de Nicopolis. He left Nicopolis Pompeii, of Lesser Armenia to live in Bondaroy, France, near the town of Pithiviers. He stayed there for seven years and taught French priests and Christians how to cook gingerbread. This was originally a dense, treaclely (molasses-based) spice cake or bread. As it was so expensive to make, early ginger biscuits were a cheap form of using up the leftover bread mix.

With the combination of knowledge spreading from Al-Andalus, and then the Crusades and subsequent spread of the spice trade to Europe, the cooking techniques and ingredients of Arabia spread into Northern Europe. By mediaeval times, biscuits were made from a sweetened, spiced paste of breadcrumbs and then baked (e.g., gingerbread), or from cooked bread enriched with sugar and spices and then baked again. King Richard I of England (aka Richard the Lionheart) left for the Third Crusade (1189–92) with "biskit of muslin", which was a mixed corn compound of barley, rye, and bean flour.

As the making and quality of bread had been controlled to this point, so were the skills of biscuit-making through the craft guilds. As the supply of sugar began, and the refinement and supply of flour increased, so did the ability to sample more leisurely foodstuffs, including sweet biscuits. Early references from the Vadstena monastery show how the Swedish nuns were baking gingerbread to ease digestion in 1444. The first documented trade of gingerbread biscuits dates to the 16th century, where they were sold in monastery pharmacies and town square farmers markets. Gingerbread became widely available in the 18th century. The Industrial Revolution in Britain sparked the formation of businesses in various industries, and the British biscuit firms of McVitie's, Carr's, Huntley & Palmers, and Crawfords were all established by 1850.

British biscuit companies vied to dominate the market with new products and eye-catching packaging. The decorative biscuit tin, invented by Huntley & Palmers in 1831, saw British biscuits exported around the world. In 1900 Huntley & Palmers biscuits were sold in 172 countries, and their global reach was reflected in their advertising. Competition and innovation among British firms saw 49 patent applications for biscuit-making equipment, tins, dough-cutting machines and ornamental moulds between 1897 and 1900. In 1891, Cadbury filed a patent for a chocolate-coated biscuit. Along with local farm produce of meat and cheese, many regions of the world have their own distinct style of biscuit due to the historic prominence of this form of food.

Introduction in South Asia

Biscuits and loaves were introduced in Bengal during the British colonial period and became popular within the Sylheti Muslim community. However, the middle-class Hindus of Cachar and Sylhet were very suspicious of biscuits and breads as they believed they were baked by Muslims. On one occasion, a few Hindus in Cachar caught an Englishman eating biscuits with tea, which caused an uproar. The information reached the Hindus of Sylhet and a small rebellion occurred. In response to this, companies started to advertise their bread as "machine-made" and "untouched by (Muslim) hand" to tell Hindus that the breads were "safe for consumption". This incident is mentioned in Bipin Chandra Pal's autobiography and he mentions how culinary habits of Hindus gradually changed and biscuits and loaves eventually became increasingly popular.

Modern "hard" biscuits

Most modern biscuits can trace their origins back to either the hardtack ship's biscuit or the creative art of the baker:
 Ship's biscuit derived: Digestive, rich tea, hobnobs 
 Baker's art: Biscuit rose de Reims

Biscuits today can be savoury (crackers) or sweet. Sandwich-style biscuits consist of two biscuits sandwiching a layer of "creme" or icing, such as the custard cream, or a layer of jam (as in the biscuits that are known as "Jammie Dodgers" in the United Kingdom).

Sweet biscuits are commonly eaten as a snack food, and are, in general, made with wheat flour or oats, and sweetened with sugar or honey. Varieties may contain chocolate, fruit, jam, nuts, ginger, or even be used to sandwich other fillings.

The digestive biscuit and rich tea have a strong identity in British culture as the traditional accompaniment to a cup of tea and are regularly eaten as such. Some tea drinkers dunk biscuits in tea, allowing them to absorb liquid and soften slightly before consumption. Chocolate digestives, rich tea, and Hobnobs were ranked the UK's top three favourite dunking biscuits in 2009. In a non-dunking poll the Chocolate Hobnob was ranked first with custard creams coming third.

Savoury biscuits or crackers (such as cream crackers, water biscuits, oatcakes, or crisp breads) are usually plainer and commonly eaten with cheese following a meal. Many savoury biscuits also contain additional ingredients for flavour or texture, such as poppy seeds, onion or onion seeds, cheese (such as cheese melts), and olives. Savoury biscuits also usually have a dedicated section in most European supermarkets, often in the same aisle as sweet biscuits. The exception to savoury biscuits is the sweetmeal digestive known as the "Hovis biscuit", which, although slightly sweet, is still classified as a cheese biscuit. Savoury biscuits sold in supermarkets are sometimes associated with a certain geographical area, such as Scottish oatcakes or Cornish wafer biscuits.

In general, the British, Australians, South Africans, New Zealanders, Indians, Bangladeshis, Pakistanis, Sri Lankans, Singaporeans, Nigerians, Kenyans, and Irish use the British meaning of "biscuit" for the sweet biscuit. The terms biscuit and cookie are used interchangeably, depending on the region and the speaker, with biscuits usually referring to hard, sweet biscuits (such as digestives, Nice, Bourbon creams, etc.) and cookies for soft baked goods (i.e. chocolate chip cookies). In Canada, biscuit is now used less frequently, usually with imported brands of biscuits or in the Maritimes; however, the Canadian Christie Biscuits referred to crackers. The British meaning  is at the root of the name of the United States' most prominent maker of cookies and crackers, the National Biscuit Company, now called Nabisco.

See also

 American and British English differences
 Biscuit tin
 Dog biscuit
 Ground biscuit
 Ka'ak
 List of baked goods
 List of biscuits and cookies
 List of shortbread biscuits and cookies
 Rusk

Notes

References

 
British cuisine
European cuisine
Twice-baked goods
Types of food